Shahrvaraz Jadhuyih was a Sasanian military officer from the Mihran family. He was related to Shahrbaraz, the Sasanian spahbed and briefly shahanshah. He participated in the battle of Isfahan along with Fadhusfan and another Persian general against the Islamic Arabs. He was, however, defeated and killed during the battle.

References

Sources 

Generals of Yazdegerd III
Year of birth unknown
642 deaths
Military personnel killed in action
House of Mihran
7th-century Iranian people